Pablo Gozzarelli (born December 3, 1985 in Santa Fe, Argentina) is an Argentine footballer currently playing for Deportivo Quevedo of the Serie B in Ecuador .

Teams
  Temperley 2007
  Estudiantes de Buenos Aires 2008
  San Marcos de Arica 2009
  Santa Fe FC 2010
  Deportivo Quevedo 2011–present

References
 Profile at BDFA 

1985 births
Living people
Argentine footballers
Argentine expatriate footballers
Estudiantes de Buenos Aires footballers
San Marcos de Arica footballers
Primera B de Chile players
Expatriate footballers in Chile
Expatriate footballers in Ecuador

Association footballers not categorized by position
Footballers from Santa Fe, Argentina